Zabelle is a female given name and surname of Armenian origin. It is derived from Zabel, itself a variation of Isabella. Notable people with the name include:

Given name 
 Zabelle C. Boyajian,  Armenian painter and writer
 Zabelle Panosian, Armenian-American soprano

Last name 
 Flora Zabelle Hitchcock (née Flora Zabelle), Turkish Broadway actress of Armenian descent

See also 
 Zabelle (novel), 1997 novel by Nancy Kricorian about the Armenian genocide
 Belle (given name)

Armenian feminine given names
Armenian-language surnames